Wendell E. Reed was an aircraft engineer noted primarily for inventing the engine microjet controller (EMC), for which he was awarded the Wright Brothers Medal in 1955.
Reed's experiences in the USAAF piloting the B-25 kindled a lifelong interest in flight and he later completed his degree at University of Wisconsin in Mechanical Engineering. He subsequently joined Solar Aircraft Co, where he developed the EMC.

References 

 University of Wisconsin–Madison College of Engineering alumni
American aerospace engineers